Oskari Jakonen (born 22 April 1997) is a Finnish professional footballer who plays for SalPa, as a winger and attacking midfielder.

References

1997 births
Living people
Finnish footballers
Finnish expatriate footballers
Salon Palloilijat players
FC Midtjylland players
Turun Palloseura footballers
Veikkausliiga players
Ykkönen players
Kakkonen players
Association football wingers
Association football midfielders
Finnish expatriate sportspeople in Denmark
Expatriate men's footballers in Denmark